Lapid is an Israeli community settlement. Located in the Latrun salient of the Green Line near Modi'in Illit, it falls under the jurisdiction of Hevel Modi'in Regional Council.

History
Lapid was established in 1996. According to B'Tselem, it was built on a strip of land designated no man's land inside the Green Line. Before the Six-Day War in 1967, this territory did not belong to either Jordan or Israel.

According to ARIJ, Israel confiscated  441 dunam of land from the Palestinian village of Saffa  after  1967 for the construction of Lapid.

References

External links
Lapid website 

Community settlements
Populated places established in 1996
Populated places in Central District (Israel)
1996 establishments in Israel